Honey Point Township (T9N R6W) is located in Macoupin County, Illinois, United States. As of the 2010 census, its population was 155 and it contained 87 housing units.

Geography

Demographics

Adjacent townships
 Shaws Point Township (north)
 Zanesville Township, Montgomery County (northeast)
 North Litchfield Township, Montgomery County (east)
 South Litchfield Township, Montgomery County (southeast)
 Cahokia Township (south)
 Gillespie Township (southwest)
 Brushy Mound Township (west)
 Carlinville Township (northwest)

References

External links
City-data.com
Illinois State Archives

Townships in Macoupin County, Illinois
Townships in Illinois